The 1995 MTV Video Music Awards aired live on September 7, 1995, honoring the best music videos from June 16, 1994, to June 15, 1995. The show was hosted by Dennis Miller at Radio City Music Hall in New York City. David Sandlin was commissioned to design the program catalogue.

TLC and Weezer were the biggest winners of the night, with each taking home four awards. TLC's music video for "Waterfalls" won the two main awards of the night: Viewer's Choice Award and Video of the Year, becoming the first African-American act to win the latter award. Weezer's video for "Buddy Holly" took home the two main technical awards: Best Direction and Breakthrough Video. Meanwhile, the sibling pair of Michael and Janet Jackson was right behind both groups in terms of wins, as their video for "Scream" earned them three moonmen. Also Michael performed for over fifteen minutes to a medley of his main songs at the ceremony.

As mentioned above, TLC's "Waterfalls" won both Video of the Year and Viewer's Choice, becoming the third and last video to accomplish this feat in a single year. Ironically, this occurred on the first year that MTV decided to have different sets of nominees for these categories (as until 1994 the practice had been to have both categories have exactly the same set of nominees). Curiously, though, the award for Breakthrough Video would end up having the same four nominees as Video of the Year in 1995, marking the only time this ever happened in VMA history.

In terms of nominations, the four videos and acts that were up for Video of the Year dominated the night.  Michael and Janet Jackson's "Scream" was the most nominated video of the night, earning a grand total of eleven nominations, including a nomination in each of the seven professional categories.  The night's big winner, TLC's "Waterfalls," was also the second most nominated video that night, earning ten nominations.  Green Day's "Basket Case" came in third place with nine nominations, while Weezer's "Buddy Holly" came in fourth with five nominations. There would not be a situation similar to this one at the VMAs until the 2009 edition.  In addition, all four videos were nominated for Best Direction.

Background
MTV announced on February 29 that the 1995 Video Music Awards would be held at Radio City Music Hall for the second consecutive year on September 7. Nominees were announced at a press conference hosted by Rudy Giuliani and Michael Jackson on July 25. Dennis Miller was announced as host in late August. The ceremony broadcast was preceded by the 1995 MTV Video Music Awards Opening Act. Hosted by Kurt Loder and Tabitha Soren with reports from Chris Connelly, Juliette Hohnen, and Alison Stewart, the broadcast featured red carpet interviews, pre-taped features on a day with White Zombie and the filming of Mariah Carey's "Fantasy" music video (as well as the video's world premiere), a pre-taped interview with Bob Weir, and performances from Silverchair.

Performances

Presenters
 Rod Stewart – presented Best Male Video
 Kennedy – appeared in commercial vignettes about the show
 Tim Robbins – introduced Live
 Patrick Swayze and Wesley Snipes – presented Best Video from a Film
 Bill Bellamy and Monica Seles – appeared in a pre-commercial vignette about previous Viewer's Choice winners and voting procedures
 Lenny Kravitz and Sheryl Crow – presented Best New Artist in a Video
 Chris Hardwick – interviewed New York Mayor Rudy Giuliani and First Lady Donna Hanover Giuliani and appeared in vignettes about the show and Viewer's Choice voting
 The Notorious B.I.G. and Bill Bellamy – presented Best Dance Video
 Kevin Bacon and Liv Tyler – presented Best Direction in a Video
 Grant Hill and Ricki Lake – presented Best R&B Video
 Natalie Merchant – introduced R.E.M.
 Kennedy and Claire Danes – appeared in a pre-commercial vignette about Viewer's Choice voting
 Madonna – presented Best Rap Video
 Mike Tyson – introduced the Red Hot Chili Peppers
 Drew Barrymore – presented the Michael Jackson Video Vanguard Award
 Seal and Des'ree (jokingly introduced by Dennis Miller as "Seal Koslowski" and "Desiree Finkelstein") – introduced the International Viewer's Choice Award winners
 VJs Anu Kottoor (Asia), Cuca Lazarotto (Brasil), Ingo Schmoll (Europe), Keiko Yamada (Japan), Alfredo Lewin (Latin America) and Schutze (Mandarin) – announced their respective region's Viewer's Choice winner
 George Clooney – presented Best Female Video
 Bryan Adams – presented Viewer's Choice
 Dennis Rodman and Christopher Walken – presented Best Alternative Video
 Bobby Brown and Whitney Houston – presented Video of the Year

Winners and nominees
Nominees were selected by members of the music industry. Winners in all categories, except the Viewer's Choice awards, were selected by over 700 members of the music industry. Winners in the Viewer's Choice categories were selected by viewers, with the U.S. winner chosen via a phone poll conducted in the days prior to and during the ceremony.

Winners are in bold text.

See also
1995 MTV Europe Music Awards

References

External links
 Official MTV site

1995
MTV Video Music Awards
MTV Video Music Awards